A corporate collapse typically involves the insolvency or bankruptcy of a major business enterprise. A corporate scandal involves alleged or actual unethical behavior by people acting within or on behalf of a corporation. Many recent corporate collapses and scandals have involved false or inappropriate accounting of some sort (see list at accounting scandals).

List of major corporate collapses 
The following list of corporations involved major collapses, through the risk of job losses or size of the business, and meant entering into insolvency or bankruptcy, or being nationalised or requiring a non-market loan by a government.

List of scandals without insolvency
 Australia & New Zealand Banking Group scandal involving misleading file notes in the Financial Ombudsman Service (Australia) presented to the Supreme Court of Victoria.
 Australia & New Zealand Banking Group allegations of racial bigotry toward billionaire businessman Pankaj Oswal and his wife. Court was presented with emails where an ANZ staff member comments to ANZ CEO Mike Smith: "We are dealing with Indians with no moral compass and an Indian woman as every bit as devious as PO (Mr Oswal)."
 Australia & New Zealand Banking Group toxic culture. Court case where allegations were made by ex-employees that the bank's senior management tolerated drugs and strip clubs.
 Australia & New Zealand Banking Group alleged manipulation of the Australian benchmark interest rates. ANZ is currently being pursued by the Australian Securities and Investments Commission, which filed an originating process in the Federal Court of Australia against ANZ in March 2016.
 BAE Systems bribery scandal related to the Al-Yamamah arms deal with Saudi Arabia
 Bristol-Myers Squibb accounting scandal
 British Airways, for the "Dirty Tricks" scandal against Virgin Atlantic
 Brown & Williamson, for chemically enhancing the addictiveness of cigarettes, becoming the leading edge of the tobacco industry scandals of the 1990s, eventually resulting in the Tobacco Master Settlement Agreement
 Chevron-Texaco Lago Agrio oil field pollution scandal
 Commonwealth Bank facts uncovered that showed the insurance arm of the bank denied life insurance policy holders despite having legitimate claims, resulting in calls for a Royal Commission into the Australian insurance industry.
 Commonwealth Bank provision of unsuitable financial advice to a large number of customers between 2003 and 2012 and continuous delay in providing compensation to victims.
 Compass Group, bribed the United Nations in order to win business
 Corrib gas controversy Kilcommon, Erris, Co. Mayo, Ireland
 Deutsche Bank, spying scandal
 Deutsche Bank Libor scandal, agreed to a combined US$2.5 billion in fines
 Duke Energy
 El Paso Corp.
 Fannie Mae, underreporting of profit
 Firestone Tire & Rubber Company, part of the General Motors streetcar conspiracy, labor controversies, Firestone and Ford tire controversy
 Forced labour under German rule during World War II, financial enrichment by several major companies
 Ford Pinto, fuel tank scandal
 Financial Ombudsman Service (Australia) scandal involving misleading file notes in the Financial Ombudsman Service (Australia) presented to the Victorian Supreme Court.
 Global Crossing
 Guinness share-trading fraud
 Hafskip's collapse
 Halliburton overcharging government contracts
 Harken Energy Scandal
 HealthSouth reporting exaggerated earnings
 Hewlett-Packard spying scandal
 Hospital Corporation of America
 Homestore.com
 KBC Bank human rights scandal
 Kerr-McGee, the Karen Silkwood case
 Kinney National Company financial scandal
 Lernout & Hauspie accounting fraud
 Lockheed bribery scandal in Germany, Japan, and Netherlands
 Livedoor scandal
 Luxembourg Leaks. Luxembourg under Jean-Claude Juncker's premiership had turned into a major European centre of corporate tax avoidance.
 Marsh McLennan
 Merck Medicaid fraud investigation
 Mirant
 Morrison-Knudsen scandal. Led to William Agee's ouster
 Mutual-fund scandal (2003)
 Nestlé
 Nugan Hand Bank
 Olympus Scandal
 Options backdating involving over 100 companies
 Pacific Gas & Electric Company, 2017 California wildfires, 2018 California wildfires
 Panama Papers International. Leak of hundreds of thousands of confidential documents pertaining to the bank accounts and companies held by politicians, High-net-worth individuals and other people, some in off-shore tax havens. The focus was Panama law firm Mossack Fonseca.
 Paradise Papers leak
 Peregrine Systems corporate executives convicted of accounting fraud
 Phar-Mor company lied to shareholders. CEO eventually sentenced to prison for fraud and company eventually became bankrupt
 Qwest Communications
 RadioShack CEO David Edmondson lied about attaining a B.A. degree from Pacific Coast Baptist College in California
 Reliant Energy
 Rite Aid accounting fraud
 Royal Dutch Shell overstated its oil reserves twice, it downgraded , or about 20 percent of its total holdings.
 S-Chips Scandals, Singapore
 Satyam Computers, India
 7-Eleven Australia. Allegations of bullying tactics, underpayment of wages and entitlements.
 Siemens Greek bribery scandal, involving cases of bribery on behalf of Siemens towards the Greek Government
 Société Générale, derivatives trading scandal causing multibillion-euro losses
 Southwest Airlines, violations of safety regulations
 SunTrust Banks, "claims of shoddy mortgage lending, servicing and foreclosure practices."
 Tesla Inc, involving "420 funding secured" private buyout scheme resulting in fraud charges against CEO Elon Musk
Tyco International, executive theft and prison sentence
 Union Carbide, the Bhopal disaster
 ValuJet, loading live oxygen generators into cargo hold of passenger jet causing fatal crash
 Volkswagen emissions violations, fraud in diesel motors pollution measurements
 David Wittig "looting" scandals
 Xerox alleged accounting irregularities involving auditor KPMG, causing restatement of financial results for the years 1997 through 2000 and fines for both companies

See also

 List of bank failures in the United States (2008–present)
 List of largest U.S. bank failures
 List of sovereign defaults
 List of stock market crashes and bear markets
 List of UK businesses entering administration during 2008–2009 financial crisis
 List of accounting scandals
 List of defunct airlines
 Agency cost
 Center for Audit Quality (CAQ)
 Corporate crime
 Global settlement
 Subprime mortgage crisis
 White collar crime

References

Further reading
 The Corporation, a documentary and book examining and criticising the corporation and its history.
 Conspiracy of Fools, Enron documentary.
 Enron: The Smartest Guys in the Room, Oscar-nominated Enron documentary.

External links
 33 biggest corporate implosions

 
Corporate crime
Political corruption
Fraud